Bassem Ali Marmar (born 28 March 1977) is a Lebanese football coach and former player.

Starting his playing career at Ahed in 1996, Marmar helped Ahed win multiple titles, most notably the 2003–04 Lebanese FA Cup, Ahed's first major trophy, and the 2007–08 Lebanese Premier League, Ahed's first league title. He was the club's captain from 2007 to his retirement in 2010.

In 2016 Marmar was appointed head coach of Ahed, helping them win numerous domestic titles, as well as the 2019 AFC Cup, the first AFC Cup title for a Lebanese side. In 2020 Marmar took charge of Kuwaiti side Al-Arabi, becoming the first Lebanese coach to manage abroad. He returned to Ahed in 2021, before resigning in 2023.

Playing career 
Marmar began his senior career with Lebanese Second Division side Ahed on 20 June 1996. He helped his side gain promotion to the Lebanese Premier League in 1998. In 2003–04 Marmar helped Ahed lift their first major trophy: the Lebanese FA Cup. Marmar stated that, at the time, he refused the captain's armband; in 2007, however, the club's management decided for Marmar to become the club's captain. As captain, in 2007–08 Marmar helped Ahed win their first ever Lebanese Premier League.

In 2010, Marmar retired as a footballer; despite his multiple injuries throughout his career, Marmar won two league titles (2007–08 and 2009–10), three Lebanese FA Cups (2003–04, 2004–05, and 2008–09), two Lebanese Elite Cups (2008 and 2010), a Lebanese Federation Cup (2004), and two Lebanese Super Cups (2008 and 2010).

Managerial career

Ahed 
In 2007 Marmar was appointed assistant manager of Ahed, which was coached by German manager Robert Jaspert. Describing his time as Jaspert's assistant, Marmar stated that he "felt like a partner", which was "what made [him] want to become a coach". Following his retirement as a player in 2010, Marmar went to Germany to get coaching courses. Upon his return to Lebanon, he was appointed technical director of Ahed's academy and youth sector. He won the under-15 league in 2012, the under-17 league in 2013 and 2014, and the under-17 league in 2015 and 2016.

In 2014 and 2015, Marmar was Ahed's caretaker manager; he became Ahed's first team manager in 2016 following the departure of Robert Jaspert. In his first season as coach, Marmar won the 2016–17 Lebanese Premier League. Marmar was nominated 2016–17 Lebanese Premier League Coach of the Season. After winning the league, Marmar went back to coaching Ahed's youth side, citing difficulties with the players as the main reason.

Three matchdays into the 2017–18 season, Marmar was re-appointed as head coach of Ahed. Marmar stated: "At that moment, there was a shift of mentality in the club. The players were starting to get accountable for their actions. The issues I faced when I was there started to vanish, so I took back the job." That season, Marmar helped Ahed win the domestic double, lifting both the league and FA Cup titles. He was awarded Lebanese Coach of the Season for the second consecutive time.

In 2018–19, Marmar helped Ahed win a second successive domestic double, lifting the league, FA Cup, and Super Cup. He went unbeaten for 46 games in a span of over two years. In 2019 Ahed beat North Korean club 25 April 1–0 in the 2019 AFC Cup Final: they became the first Lebanese football club to accomplish the feat. Ahed only conceded three goals in 11 games, going unbeaten throughout the whole tournament. For the third consecutive time, Marmar was named Lebanese Coach of the Season. As Ahed's manager Marmar has won three league titles, two FA Cups, and two Super Cups, as well as the 2019 AFC Cup.

Al-Arabi 
On 25 July 2020, after being involved with Ahed for 24 years as a player and as a manager, Marmar was hired as head coach of Kuwait Premier League club Al-Arabi. He became the first Lebanese manager to coach outside of Lebanon at professional level. Marmar reunited with former Ahed players Ahmad Al Saleh and Issah Yakubu. In Marmar's first game he helped Al-Arabi win 4–1 against Burgan on 10 September, in the quarter-finals of the 2019–20 Kuwait Crown Prince Cup. Marmar won the competition, after beating Kuwait SC 2–1 in the final on 21 September. After one draw and one defeat in his first two league games, Marmar was dismissed on 26 October.

Return to Ahed 
On 19 January 2021, ahead of the second leg of the 2020–21 season, Ahed announced that Marmar had returned as head coach. Ahed announced Marmar's resignation on 9 January 2023.

Personal life 
Marmar was born on 28 March 1977 in Khobar, Saudi Arabia, to Lebanese parents; his family is originally from Tayibe, Lebanon. Marmar is fluent in both Arabic and English.

Honours

Player
Ahed
 Lebanese Premier League: 2007–08, 2009–10
 Lebanese FA Cup: 2003–04, 2004–05, 2008–09
 Lebanese Elite Cup: 2008, 2010
 Lebanese Federation Cup: 2004
 Lebanese Super Cup: 2008, 2010

Manager
Ahed
 AFC Cup: 2019
 Lebanese Premier League: 2016–17, 2017–18, 2018–19, 2021–22
 Lebanese FA Cup: 2017–18, 2018–19
 Lebanese Elite Cup: 2022; runner-up: 2021
 Lebanese Super Cup: 2018, 2019

Al-Arabi
 Kuwait Crown Prince Cup: 2019–20

Individual
 Lebanese Premier League Best Coach: 2016–17, 2017–18, 2018–19

References

External links

 
 
 

1977 births
Living people
People from Khobar
Lebanese footballers
Association football midfielders
Association football defenders
Al Ahed FC players
Lebanese Second Division players
Lebanese Premier League players
Lebanese football managers
Al Ahed FC managers
Al-Arabi SC (Kuwait) managers
Lebanese Premier League managers
Kuwait Premier League managers
AFC Cup winning managers
Lebanese expatriate football managers
Expatriate football managers in Kuwait
Lebanese expatriate sportspeople in Germany
Lebanese expatriate sportspeople in Kuwait